Farm to Market Roads in Texas are owned and maintained by the Texas Department of Transportation (TxDOT).

FM 1600

Farm to Market Road 1600 (FM 1600) is located in Milam County.

FM 1601

Farm to Market Road 1601 (FM 1601) is located in Ector and Crane counties.

FM 1602

Farm to Market Road 1602 (FM 1602) is located in Hamilton County.

FM 1603

Farm to Market Road 1603 (FM 1603) is located in Navarro County.

FM 1604

Farm to Market Road 1604 (FM 1604) is located in Hill County. It was designated on November 7, 1980, on its current route as a renumbering of the FM 308 spur connection in Irene.

FM 1604 (1951)

FM 1604 was first designated on January 30, 1951. The highway ran north from FM 1153 near Seymour northward  to a point in Baylor County. FM 1604 was cancelled on January 14, 1957, and transferred to RM 1919.

FM 1604 (1957)

On December 19, 1958, FM 1604 was extended  to US 90. On August 7, 1959, the highway was extended another  when it absorbed Loop 334 from US 87 to FM 2173 (now Macdona Lacoste Road) in Macdona. FM 1604 was extended to the San Antonio River on May 3, 1963. On August 23, 1964, FM 1627 (which went from I-35 to SH 218) became part of FM 1604 because the sections from US 281 to I-35 and from SH 218 to US 90 opened. On August 23, 1973, the section of FM 1518 from SH 16 to FM 2173 was redesignated and officially signed as FM 1604. On September 4, 1973, most of FM 2173, which went from Kinney Road south of Macdona to FM 1518, was redesignated and officially signed as FM 1604. The rest of FM 2173 was given to the city of Somerset. On June 30, 1977, FM 1604 was cancelled and re-designated as Loop 1604 as the section from US 90 south to FM 1518 opened, creating a full loop, replacing the section of FM 1518 from SH 16 to the current junction with Loop 1604.

FM 1605

Farm to Market Road 1605 (FM 1605) is located in Scurry County.

FM 1605 begins at an intersection with SH 350 in Snyder. The highway runs along 37th Street in the southern part of the town before ending at an intersection with US 180/Bus. US 84/SH 208.

The current FM 1605 was designated on October 2, 1959, running from SH 350 to US 84 (now Bus. US 84).

FM 1605 (1951)

The first use of the FM 1605 designation was in Brazoria County on January 30, 1951, from FM 521 to SH 288. FM 1605 was cancelled on October 15, 1954, and became a portion of FM 1460 (now SH 332).

FM 1605 (1955)

The second use of the FM 1605 designation was in Scurry County on July 28, 1955, running from SH 350 to US 84 (now US 84 Business). FM 1605 was cancelled on September 1, 1958, as the county could not secure right of way.

FM 1605 (1958)

FM 1605 was designated a third time on October 31, 1958. The highway ran from US 83 to the Taylor-Jones county line. FM 1605 was cancelled on October 2, 1959, and redesignated as FM 2404, as the above FM 1605 (cancelled on September 1, 1958) had right of way secured (right of way had not been secured earlier, but it was secured).

FM 1606

Farm to Market Road 1606 (FM 1606) is located in Scurry and Fisher counties.

FM 1607

Farm to Market Road 1607 (FM 1607) is located in Scurry County.

FM 1607 begins at an intersection with FM 1606 west of Snyder. The highway runs east and has an overlap with FM 1609 and intersects FM 1611 before entering Snyder. FM 1607 runs along 37th Street to El Paso Avenue, and then along El Paso Avenue before ending at an intersection with US 180.

FM 1607 was designated on June 21, 1951, running from US 180 in Snyder westward to what is now FM 1611. The highway was extended further west to FM 1609 on October 29, 1953. On September 1, 1954, FM 1607 was extended west to FM 1606, absorbing FM 1608.

FM 1608

Farm to Market Road 1608 (FM 1608) is located in Knox and Baylor counties.

FM 1608 (1951)

The original FM 1608 was designated on June 21, 1951, from FM 1606, 2 miles south of US 180, east 3 miles to FM 1609. FM 1608 was cancelled on September 1, 1954, and became a portion of FM 1607.

RM 1608

RM 1608 was designated on October 31, 1958, from FM 471, 1 mile west of the Bexar County line, west  to a road intersection. RM 1608 was cancelled on May 21, 1970, and transferred to FM 1283.

FM 1609

Farm to Market Road 1609 (FM 1609) is located in Scurry County.

FM 1610

Farm to Market Road 1610 (FM 1610) is located in Borden and Scurry counties.

FM 1611

Farm to Market Road 1611 (FM 1611) is located in Scurry County.

FM 1612

Farm to Market Road 1612 (FM 1612) is located in Swisher and Hale counties.

FM 1612 (1951)

The original FM 1612 was designated on June 21, 1951, from US 84 (now Business US 84-H) in Hermleigh northwest to US 180. FM 1612 was cancelled on February 24, 1953, and transferred to FM 644.

FM 1613

Farm to Market Road 1613 (FM 1613) is located in Scurry County.

FM 1614

Farm to Market Road 1614 (FM 1614) is located in Scurry County.

FM 1615

Farm to Market Road 1615 (FM 1615) is located in Henderson County.

FM 1616

Farm to Market Road 1616 (FM 1616) is located in Henderson County.

FM 1617

Farm to Market Road 1617 (FM 1617) is located in Trinity County.

FM 1617 (1951)

The original FM 1617 was designated on May 23, 1951, from FM 316 at Payne Springs west and north 6 miles to FM 85. FM 1617 was cancelled on October 3, 1961, and transferred to FM 90, which also replaced the portion of FM 85 north of FM 1250.

FM 1618

Farm to Market Road 1618 (FM 1618) is located in Leon County.

FM 1618 (1951)

The original FM 1618 was designated on May 23, 1951, from Loop 46 at Post northeast  to a road intersection 0.7 mile north of Yellow House Fork of the Brazos River. On November 20, 1951, the road was extended northeast . FM 1618 was cancelled on February 24, 1953, and transferred to FM 651.

FM 1619

Farm to Market Road 1619 (FM 1619) is located in Hall and Childress counties.

FM 1620

Farm to Market Road 1620 (FM 1620) is located in Guadalupe County.

FM 1621

Farm to Market Road 1621 (FM 1621) is located in Kendall County.

FM 1621 (1951)

The original FM 1621 was designated on May 23, 1951, from US 81 at Selma southeast to FM 78 at Schertz. FM 1621 was cancelled on August 8, 1958, and transferred to FM 1518.

FM 1622

Farm to Market Road 1622 (FM 1622) is located in Yoakum County.

FM 1622 (1951)

The original FM 1622 was designated on May 23, 1951, from US 281 south of Twin Sisters west to Kendall (now Kendalia). FM 1622 was cancelled on December 17, 1952, and transferred to FM 473.

RM 1623

Ranch to Market Road 1623 (RM 1623) is located in Gillespie and Blanco counties.

RM 1623 begins in eastern Gillespie County at an intersection with RM 2721. It travels to the south into Stonewall, where it crosses Ranch Road 1, and has a one-block eastward concurrency with US 290 before continuing southward. It then turns to the southeast and crosses into Blanco County. The route intersects RM 1888 before turning to the east and running along the north bank of the Blanco River into Blanco. The RM 1623 designation ends at US 281 in central Blanco; the roadway continues as Loop 163.

The extension into Gillespie County and to US 290 was approved on August 24, 1955. The route was redesignated on November 26, 1969, as RM 1623, the same day the extension to RM 2721 was added.

Junction list

FM 1624

Farm to Market Road 1624 (FM 1624) is located in Lee County.

FM 1624 was designated on May 23, 1951, from SH 21 south of Lincoln northwestward  toward Fedor to the south end of the Yegua Creek Bridge. On November 20, 1951, FM 1624 was extended northwest  to Fedor School. On May 21, 1953, FM 1624 was extended eastward from SH 21 to US 77. On June 28, 1963, FM 1624 was extended east to Loop 123 & FM 696 in Lexington.

FM 1625

Farm to Market Road 1625 (FM 1625) is located in Travis County.

FM 1625 begins at an intersection in Creedmoor. It passes FM 1327 and then continues north  to its terminus at a dead end right next to the intersection of US 183 and William Cannon Drive, near the community of Colton south of Austin-Bergstrom International Airport.

FM 1625 was originally assigned on May 23, 1951, to a road segment between FM 1327 in Creedmoor and the then-current alignment of SH 29 in mid-1951. This segment was then combined with FM 1327 on November 20, 1951. The new alignment was assigned on November 20, 1951; the section south of FM 1327 was originally part of FM 1327.

FM 1625 originally had its northern terminus at US 183 in Colton, but it was truncated  to a dead end circa 2020 after William Cannon Drive was extended to intersect US 183.

Junction list

FM 1626

Farm to Market Road 1626 (FM 1626) is located in Travis and Hays counties.

The road begins at a junction with I-35 in Kyle. It runs north, intersecting RM 967 in Hays, just west of Buda, and continues to run north before turning east. It runs east through Manchaca before ending at another intersection with I-35 in southern Austin, just east of San Leanna.

Construction began in fall 2013 to expand the roadway from two lanes to four lanes with a center turn lane. The project was expected to be completed in fall 2014; however, it is still incomplete .

FM 1626 was designated on May 23, 1951, from US 81 (now I-35) west  to Manchaca. On May 6, 1964, FM 1626 was extended to RM 967. On October 26, 1983, FM 1626 was extended to FM 2770. On May 24, 2007, FM 1626 was extended south to I-35.

Junction list

FM 1627

Farm to Market Road 1627 (FM 1627) was located in Bexar County. No highway currently uses the FM 1627 designation.

The highway was cancelled on August 13, 1964, and replaced by FM 1604 (now Loop 1604).

FM 1628

Farm to Market Road 1628 (FM 1628) is located in Bexar County.

FM 1629

Farm to Market Road 1629 (FM 1629) is located in Fannin County.

FM 1629 (1951)

The original FM 1629 was designated on May 23, 1951, from FM 1203 at Callisburg east and north  to a road intersection 1 mile south of Sturgeon. FM 1629 was cancelled on February 6, 1953, and transferred to FM 1203 (now FM 678).

FM 1630

FM 1630 terminates at FM 677 at its western end and at FM 51 at its eastern end.

FM 1630 was designated on May 23, 1951, from FM 51 southwest  to a road intersection. On November 20 of that year, FM 1630 was extended southwest  to another road intersection. On August 24, 1955, FM 1630 was extended west to FM 677.

RM 1631

Ranch to Market Road 1631 (RM 1631) is located in Gillespie County.

 It was originally Farm to Market Road 1631.

FM 1632

Farm to Market Road 1632 (FM 1632) is located in Tyler County.

FM 1632 (1951)

The original FM 1632 was designated on May 23, 1951, from SH 290 (now SH 116) at Smyer south  to a county road. On March 31, 1955, the road was extended south  to FM 41. FM 1632 was cancelled on January 13, 1960, and transferred to FM 168.

FM 1633

Farm to Market Road 1633 (FM 1633) is located in Limestone County.

FM 1634

Farm to Market Road 1634 (FM 1634) is located in Wichita County.

FM 1634 (1951)

The original FM 1634 was designated on May 23, 1951, from FM 300, 2.5 miles south of SH 290 (now SH 116), west  to the Cochran County line. Four months later the road was extended west  to FM 769. FM 1634 was cancelled on February 10, 1966, and became a portion of FM 300.

FM 1635

Farm to Market Road 1635 (FM 1635) is located in Cass County.

FM 1635 (1951)

The original FM 1635 was designated on May 23, 1951, from SH 290 (now SH 116), 6.2 miles west of Levelland south  to then-proposed FM 1634. FM 1635 was cancelled on February 10, 1966, and became a portion of FM 303.

FM 1636

Farm to Market Road 1636 (FM 1636) is located in Jones County.

FM 1636 (1951)

The original FM 1636 was designated on May 23, 1951, from US 81, 2 miles north of Waco to northwest 11 miles to Gholson. This was corrected to  six months later. FM 1636 was cancelled on October 18, 1954, and became a portion of FM 1244 (now FM 933; FM 1244 was reassigned to the old route of FM 933).

FM 1637

Farm to Market Road 1637 (FM 1637) runs from FM 56 to Lake Shore Drive in Waco.

FM 1637 begins at an intersection with FM 56 north of Valley Mills and runs parallel in close proximity to the North Bosque River from here to FM 185 (North River Crossing Road) in Waco. In Waco, the highway is known as China Spring Road from FM 185 to FM 3051, running near Lake Waco and along the northern boundary of Waco Regional Airport before turning in a more southward direction. At FM 3051, FM 1637 is known as 19th Street and crosses over the Bosque River and runs through less developed areas of Waco before ending at Lake Shore Drive.

FM 1637 was designated on May 23, 1951, running northwest from US 84 to the community of Earth. On October 26, 1954, the highway was extended  to a road intersection north of China Spring. On June 25, 1965, FM 1637 was extended another , absorbing FM 2704. On September 30, 1970, the highway was relocated around China Spring, adding a loop through that town. On June 27, 1995, the section of FM 185 to US 84 was transferred to Urban Road 1637. On April 2, 2017, the section from Lake Shore Drive to US 84 was given to the city of Waco. This section is now 19th Street, 18th Street, Lyle Avenue/Herring Avenue, and 4th Street/5th Street.

Junction list

FM 1638

Farm to Market Road 1638 (FM 1638) is located in Nacogdoches County.

FM 1639

Farm to Market Road 1639 (FM 1639) runs from FM 3053 near Overton northeast to SH 31 near Kilgore.

FM 1639 was designated on May 23, 1951, from SH 135 in Overton to SH 31. On December 20, 1963, the highway was extended northeast over the old location of SH 31. On February 1, 1964, FM 1639 was rerouted to end at FM 850. On November 31, 1972, the section south of FM 3053 was transferred to FM 3053.

FM 1640

Farm to Market Road 1640 (FM 1640) is located in Fort Bend County. The highway begins at Spur 529 in Rosenberg and follows a city street east to FM 762 in Richmond.

FM 1640 begins at Spur 529 on the western edge of Rosenberg and follows Avenue I east for most of its length. This stretch of Avenue I passes the administration building for the Lamar Consolidated Independent School District and Traylor Stadium's south grandstand. In the last  before the intersection, FM 1640 changes direction from east to northeast. In this area, there are several businesses including a Valero filling station and a Walmart on the south side of the highway and a Wharton County Junior College campus on the north side. After going  to the northeast, FM 1640 crosses Union Pacific Railroad tracks and ends at a traffic light at FM 762 in front of the George Memorial Library. The continuation of the road to the northeast is called Golfview Drive.

On January 1, 1966, the highway was extended an additional  along Avenue I to US 59. The old route along Millie Street from Avenue I to US 59 became a spur connection. A 1955 USGS map showed that US 59 shared its right-of-way with US 90 Alternate, which still passes through downtown Richmond and Rosenberg. US 59 split off from US 90A on the west side of Rosenberg in 1955 and headed southwest. By the time the 1971 USGS map was published, US 59 bypassed Rosenberg to the south and Spur 529 used the former right-of-way of US 59 west of Rosenberg. On April 3, 2006, the spur connection to US 90A at Millie Street was removed from the state highway system. In 2017, FM 1640 and US 90A were converted to a one-way pair in Rosenberg.

Junction list

FM 1641

Farm to Market Road 1641 (FM 1641) is located in Kaufman County. It is known locally as Talty Road. FM 1641 begins at an intersection with FM 148 in Talty, with southbound traffic on FM 1641 continuing straight at the intersection traveling on northbound FM 148. The highway travels through the city before meeting I-20 at exit 493. FM 1641 continues to Forney to an intersection with FM 548 just south of US 80.

FM 1641 was designated on May 23, 1951, from US 80 to FM 148 in Talty. On January 18, 1960, the section from FM 740 Spur to US 80 was transferred to the new FM 688, along with FM 740 Spur itself.

FM 1642

Farm to Market Road 1642 (FM 1642) is located in Collingsworth and Childress counties.

FM 1642 (1951)

The original FM 1642 was designated on May 23, 1951, from SH 16, 0.3 mile south of Priddy, west  to a road intersection 1 mile west of Democrat. On December 17, 1952, the road was extended west  to FM 590 at Zephyr. On August 25, 1953, the western terminus was moved to US 84. FM 1642 was cancelled on October 28, 1953, and transferred to FM 218.

FM 1643

Farm to Market Road 1643 (FM 1643) is located in Wood County.

FM 1643 (1951)

The original FM 1643 was designated on May 23, 1951, from Loop 177 at Moscow west  to a road intersection. On November 5, 1952, the eastern terminus was moved to US 59 as a section of Loop 177 was transferred to FM 1643. On October 13, 1954, the road was extended west  to FM 350 near Colita. FM 1643 was cancelled on February 21, 1958, and transferred to FM 350.

FM 1644

Farm to Market Road 1644 (FM 1644) is located in Robertson County.

FM 1645

Farm to Market Road 1645 (FM 1645) is located in Shelby County.

FM 1646

Farm to Market Road 1646 (FM 1646) is located in Stonewall County.

FM 1646 (1951)

The original FM 1646 was designated on May 23, 1951, from SH 6, 6.0 miles south of Breckenridge, eastward to a road intersection (current FM 1852). FM 1646 was cancelled on August 29, 1951, and transferred to FM 576.

FM 1647

Farm to Market Road 1647 (FM 1647) is located in Wood County.

FM 1648

Farm to Market Road 1648 (FM 1648) is located in Nacogdoches County.

FM 1648 (1951)

The original FM 1648 was designated on May 23, 1951, from SH 16 in Cherokee west  to a county road. On November 21, 1956, the road was extended west  to a road intersection. On October 31, 1957, the road was extended west to Pontotoc, but FM 1648 was cancelled on November 29, 1957, and transferred to FM 501, which became RM 501 that day.

FM 1649

Farm to Market Road 1649 (FM 1649) is located in Upshur County.

FM 1650

Farm to Market Road 1650 (FM 1650) is located primarily in Upshur County. The western terminus of FM 1650 is east of Gilmer, at an intersection with SH 154. The route generally travels to the southeast and passes through unincorporated communities including Bethlehem. It ends at an intersection with U.S. Highway 259 (US 259) shortly after entering Gregg County.

FM 1650 was designated along its current routing on May 23, 1951, from SH 154 to SH 26. SH 26 would be canceled in its entirety and be replaced by US 259 when that route was commissioned on December 12, 1962.

Junction list

FM 1651

Farm to Market Road 1651 (FM 1651) is located in Van Zandt County.

FM 1652

Farm to Market Road 1652 (FM 1652) is located entirely Van Zandt County.

FM 1653

Farm to Market Road 1653 (FM 1653) is located in Van Zandt County.

FM 1654

Farm to Market Road 1654 (FM 1654) was located in Van Zandt County. There is currently no highway using the FM 1654 designation.

FM 1654 was designated on May 23, 1951, from SH 198 south of Canton to SH 64 southeast of Canton, and was signed (but not designated) as part of SH 243 upon completion. FM 1654 was cancelled on August 29, 1990, as the SH 243 designation became official.

FM 1655

Farm to Market Road 1655 (FM 1655) is a two-lane highway connecting various farming areas of Wise and Montague counties. It runs from U.S. Highway 380 (US 380), near Bridgeport, to FM 455, near Forestburg. Towns served by FM 1655 include Bridgeport, Alvord, and Chico in Wise County and Forestburg in Montague County.

On February 6, 1953, FM 1655 was extended south and west to SH 24/SH 114 (now SH 101) in Chico, replacing FM 1881. On September 27, 1960, FM 1655 was extended northeast to FM 455. On August 29, 1961, SH 24 and SH 114 were relocated in Chico, causing FM 1655 to lose . On Match 27, 1963, the section of FM 1655 from FM 1810 to SH 24/SH 114 was transferred to FM 1810, and the section of FM 1810 from what was then FM 2403 to SH 24 (now US 380) was transferred to FM 1655.

FM 1656

Farm to Market Road 1656 (FM 1656) is located in Shelby County.

FM 1656 (1951)

The first use of the FM 1656 designation was in Wise County, from FM 51 via Slidell to the Denton County line. FM 1656 was cancelled two months later and became a portion of FM 425 (now FM 455).

FM 1656 (1951–1960)

The next use of the FM 1656 designation was in Lynn County, from FM 211, 2.5 miles southeast of Wilson, south  to a road intersection. On September 21, 1955, the road was extended south  to US 380. FM 1656 was cancelled on November 15, 1960, and transferred to FM 1054.

FM 1657

Farm to Market Road 1657 (FM 1657) is a designation that has been used four times. The current use is in Fisher County, from FM 611 south to US 180.

FM 1657 (1951–1952)

The first use of the FM 1657 designation was in Wise County, from FM 51 to Greenwood. Eight months later FM 1657 was cancelled and transferred to FM 455.

FM 1657 (1951–1953)

The second use of the FM 1657 designation was in Hood County, from SH 144 in Granbury southwest  to a road intersection. FM 1657 was cancelled on February 6, 1953, and transferred to FM 51.

FM 1657 (1953–1954)

The third use of the FM 1657 designation was in McLennan County, from SH 6, 3.5 miles northwest of Speegleville, east 8 miles to FM 1637 at Bosqueville. FM 1657 was cancelled on October 26, 1954, and removed from the highway system in exchange for extending FM 185.

FM 1658

Farm to Market Road 1658 (FM 1658) is located in Wise County.

FM 1659

Farm to Market Road 1659 (FM 1659) was located in Llano County. There is currently no highway using the FM 1659 designation.

FM 1659 was designated on May 23, 1951, from FM 386 (later FM 734 and RM 734, now SH 71) east and south via Valley Spring to FM 386. FM 1659 was cancelled on October 29, 2004, and returned to Llano County.

FM 1660

Farm to Market Road 1660 (FM 1660) is located in Williamson County. When the road was created on May 23, 1951, it ran from Hutto southeast  to Norman's Crossing. On September 29, 1954, the road was extended to join with FM 973 at Rice's Crossing. On December 13, 1956, the portion of FM 973 that ran toward Coupland was redesignated as FM 1660, but signage did not change until the travel map was published. On June 28, 1963, the road was extended north from Hutto to Jonah.

Junction list

FM 1661

Farm to Market Road 1661 (FM 1661) is located in Haskell and Jones counties.

FM 1662

Farm to Market Road 1662 (FM 1662) is located in Rusk County.

FM 1662 (1951)

The original FM 1662 was designated on May 23, 1951, from FM 73 at Prairie Hill northwest  to the Hill County line. FM 1662 was cancelled on November 13, 1953, and transferred to FM 737 (now FM 339).

FM 1663

Farm to Market Road 1663 (FM 1663) is located in Chambers County. It runs from SH 61 at Hankamer to SH 73/SH 124 at Winnie.

FM 1663 was designated on August 15, 1955, from the north end of FM 1724, 3 miles east of Hankamer, east  to a road intersection. On November 21, 1956, the road was extended east and south . On October 31, 1957, the road was extended south to SH 73-T (now SH 65) and west to SH 61 at Hankamer. On May 25, 1966, the section from FM 1410 south  to SH 73-T was transferred to FM 1410 while FM 1663 was rerouted east to I-10/Spur 5 at Winnie, replacing FM 2990. On August 4, 1988, the road was extended to SH 73/SH 124 at Winnie, replacing Spur 5.

FM 1663 (1951)

The original FM 1663 was designated on May 23, 1951, from SH 14 at Kosse northwest  to a road intersection at Coit. FM 1663 was cancelled on October 18, 1954, and became a portion of FM 339.

FM 1664

Farm to Market Road 1664 (FM 1664) is located in Maverick County.

FM 1665

Farm to Market Road 1665 (FM 1665) is located in Maverick County.

FM 1666

Farm to Market Road 1666 (FM 1666) is located in Maverick County.

FM 1667

Farm to Market Road 1667 (FM 1667) is located in Henderson County.

FM 1667 (1951)

The original FM 1667 was designated on May 23, 1951, from FM 1436 at La Pryor east across US 83, then north and west to US 83. FM 1667 was cancelled on March 22, 1955, and became a portion of FM 1436.

FM 1668

Farm to Market Road 1668 (FM 1668) is located in Zavala County.

FM 1669

Farm to Market Road 1669 (FM 1669) is located in Angelina County.

FM 1670

Farm to Market Road 1670 (FM 1670) is located in Bell County.

FM 1671

Farm to Market Road 1671 (FM 1671) is located in Falls and Bell counties.

RM 1672

Ranch to Market Road 1672 (RM 1672) is located in Coke County.

 It was originally designated as FM 1672.

FM 1673

Farm to Market Road 1673 (FM 1673) is located in Scurry County.

FM 1673 (1951)

The original FM 1673 was designated on May 23, 1951, from US 277, 1 mile north of Bronte, to the Runnels County line. FM 1673 was cancelled on October 18, 1954, and became a portion of FM 384.

RM 1674

Ranch to Market Road 1674 (RM 1674) is located in Kimble and Menard counties. It runs from US 377/Loop 481 north of Junction to RM 864 at Fort McKavett.

 RM 1674 was designated as FM 1674 on May 23, 1951, from US 290 (now I-10), 3.6 miles east of Roosevelt, northwest  to a road intersection. On November 20, 1951, the road was extended north . On November 21, 1956, the route was changed to RM 1674 and extended north  to RM 864 at Fort McKavett. On July 1, 1969, the road was extended east  over a former section of US 290 to US 377/Loop 481 north of Junction. On November 25, 1975, a  section from RM 864 north to SH 29 (now US 190) was added, but this was cancelled on January 24, 1978.

RM 1675

Ranch to Market Road 1675 (RM 1675) is located in Reagan County. It runs from US 67 via Texon and Santa Rita to US 67.

 RM 1675 was designed on May 23, 1951, on the current route as FM 1675. The only change was on November 13, 1959, when the route was changed to RM 1675.

RM 1676

Ranch to Market Road 1676 (RM 1676) is located in Reagan and Crockett counties.

 It was originally designated as FM 1676.

FM 1677

Farm to Market Road 1677 (FM 1677) is located in Runnels County.

FM 1678

Farm to Market Road 1678 (FM 1678) is located in Runnels County.

FM 1679

Farm to Market Road 1679 (FM 1679) is located in Calhoun County.

FM 1680

Farm to Market Road 1680 (FM 1680) is located in Gonzales and Lavaca counties.

FM 1681

Farm to Market Road 1681 (FM 1681) is located in Gonzales and Wilson counties.

FM 1682

Farm to Market Road 1682 (FM 1682) is located in Gonzales County. It runs from SH 80 in Leesville to SH 97 in Bebe.

FM 1682 was designated on May 23, 1951, from SH 80 in Leesville, eastward  to a road intersection. On November 20, 1951, it was extended eastward to SH 200 (now SH 97).

FM 1683

Farm to Market Road 1683 (FM 1683) is located in Jackson County.

FM 1684

Farm to Market Road 1684 (FM 1684) is located in Refugio County.

FM 1684 (1951)

The original FM 1684 was designated on May 23, 1951, from FM 1019 southeast of Bigwells southeast to FM 468 northwest of Cotulla. On July 31, 1952, the road was rerouted over a section of former FM 468 to Woodward (the former section of FM 1684 became part of FM 468). FM 1684 was cancelled on October 28, 1953, and transferred to FM 469.

FM 1685

Farm to Market Road 1685 (FM 1685) is located in Victoria County.

FM 1686

Farm to Market Road 1686 (FM 1686) is located in Victoria County.

FM 1687

Farm to Market Road 1687 (FM 1687), known locally as Sandy Point Road, is located in Brazos County, running from FM 50 in Mudville, eastward to FM 158 and SH 21 in Bryan.

FM 1687 was designated on May 23, 1951, from SH 21 in Bryan to SH OSR. On November 24, 1959, FM 1687 was extended west  to a road intersection. On September 27, 1960, FM 1687 was extended west to FM 50. On June 27, 1995, the section from FM 2818 to SH 21 was transferred to UR 1687, but this section was changed back to FM 1687 on November 15, 2018.

FM 1688

Farm to Market Road 1688 (FM 1688), known locally as Leonard Road, is located in Brazos County, running from SH 47 northeastward to FM 2818 in Bryan.

FM 1688 was designated on May 23, 1951, from Loop 158 (now FM 158) southwest  to a road intersection. On February 26, 1986, FM 1688 was extended to FM 60. On December 14, 1989, the section from FM 158 to FM 2818 was given to the city of Bryan. On October 28, 1992, the section from SH 47 to FM 60 was transferred to SH 47 (which the route had been decided to follow the proposed route of FM 1688) and FM 1179 (this section of FM 1179 was changed to be built as a county road (Jones Road) on October 26, 1995). On June 27, 1995, FM 1688 was transferred to UR 1688, but this was changed back to FM 1688 on November 15, 2018.

FM 1689

Farm to Market Road 1689 (FM 1689) is located in Brown and Comanche counties. The road begins in May off of U.S. Highway 183 (US 183), and continues east, entering Comanche county, as both FM 1477 ends at it and FM 589 merges and eventually ends at FM 1689 in Sidney. The highway ends at SH 36 in Comanche.

FM 1689 was designated on May 23, 1951, from US 283 (now US 183) in May eastward  to a road intersection at the Comanche county line. On October 28, 1953, FM 1689 was extended east to FM 589 at Sidney, replacing a section of FM 589. On November 21, 1956, FM 1689 was extended southeast  to a road intersection. On September 27, 1960, FM 1689 was extended southeast to SH 36, replacing FM 2634 from SH 36 west .

FM 1690

Farm to Market Road 1690 (FM 1690) is located in Lampsas and Coryell counties.

RM 1691

Ranch to Market Road 1691 (RM 1691) is located in Sutton County.

 It was originally designated as FM 1691.

FM 1692

Farm to Market Road 1692 (FM 1692) is located in Tom Green and Runnels counties.

FM 1693

Farm to Market Road 1693 (FM 1693) is located in Colorado County.

FM 1694

Farm to Market Road 1694 (FM 1694) is located in Nueces County.

FM 1694 (1951)

The original FM 1694 was designated on May 23, 1951, from SH 200 (now US 90A) west and south to near Calhoun. FM 1694 was cancelled on February 24, 1953, and eliminated from the highway system in exchange for extending FM 1597 (now FM 1093); FM 1694 was to be transferred to FM 1597, but this never happened.

FM 1695

Farm to Market Road 1695 (FM 1695) is located in McLennan County. It runs from US 84 west of Waco to I-35. The highway is locally known as Hewitt Drive for its entire length.

FM 1695 begins at I-35/FM 3148 in Hewitt. The highway travels in a northwest direction before turning in a slight northeast direction at an interchange with FM 2113 (Spring Valley Road). FM 1695 travels near the town square and turns back to the northwest at FM 2063 (Sun Valley Boulevard). The highway enters Woodway before ending at US 84.

FM 1695 was designated on October 31, 1958, from US 84, 1.5 miles west of Waco, south via Hewitt to FM 2113. On June 30, 1995, the route was redesignated Urban Road 1695 (UR 1695). On September 25, 2008, by district request, the road was extended to I-35. The designation reverted to FM 1695 with the elimination of the Urban Road system on November 15, 2018.

Junction list

FM 1695 (1951)

The original FM 1695 was designated on May 23, 1951, from FM 488 west  to Saint Elmo. FM 1695 was cancelled on November 22, 1954, and became a portion of FM 246 (now FM 416).

FM 1696

Farm to Market Road 1696 (FM 1696) is located in Grimes and Walker counties.

FM 1697

Farm to Market Road 1697 (FM 1697) is located in Washington and Lee counties.

FM 1698

Farm to Market Road 1698 (FM 1698) is located in Terry County.

FM 1698 (May 1951)

The original FM 1698 was designated on May 23, 1951, from SH 11 at Como south  to a county road. FM 1698 was cancelled two months later and became a portion of FM 270 (now FM 69).

FM 1699

Farm to Market Road 1699 (FM 1699) is located in Red River County.

Notes

References

+16
Farm to market roads 1600
Farm to Market Roads 1600